Björn Sebastian Starke Hedlund (born 5 April 1995) is a Swedish footballer who plays for Östers IF as a defender. He represented Sweden at the 2016 Summer Olympics in Rio de Janeiro, Brazil.

Starke Hedlund joined Öster on a free transfer in december 2022.

References

External links

Elite Football profile

1995 births
Living people
Association football defenders
FC Schalke 04 II players
GAIS players
Östers IF players
Kalmar FF players
Superettan players
Allsvenskan players
Swedish footballers
Sweden youth international footballers
Sweden under-21 international footballers
Footballers from Stockholm
Footballers at the 2016 Summer Olympics
Olympic footballers of Sweden
Mjøndalen IF players